is a tram station in Ino, Agawa District, Kōchi Prefecture, Japan.

Lines
Tosa Electric Railway
Ino Line

Layout
1 track is sandwiched between 2 side platforms.

Adjacent stations

|-
!colspan=5|Tosa Electric Railway

External links

Railway stations in Kōchi Prefecture
Railway stations in Japan opened in 2007